Robert Catlin (born 22 June 1965) is an English-born Australian former professional football (soccer) player who played in the Football League for Notts County and Birmingham City and played more than 300 games in the Australian National Soccer League. He played as a goalkeeper.

Career
Catlin was born in Wembley, London and raised in Australia. He began his football career in Australian domestic football, playing for APIA-Leichhardt and 140 games and scoring one goal in the National Soccer League (NSL) for Marconi Fairfield before deciding to try his luck in England. Catlin and compatriot Shaun Murphy joined Notts County in August 1992 for a total fee of £137,000. Catlin conceded eight goals in his first three appearances for the club. In March 1993 he joined Birmingham City on loan, but after his first game it transpired that the club had mistakenly signed him instead of the Notts County youth goalkeeper they had watched. In November 1993, Notts County were fined £20,000 for irregularities in the transfer of Catlin and Murphy, relating to payments made to a third party other than the players' clubs.

In 1994 Catlin returned to Australia where he played out a long career with numerous clubs. He holds the record for appearances by a goalkeeper in Australia's national competitions. In December 2000, he became the first NSL keeper to record 100 clean sheets when Newcastle United held league leader South Melbourne to a 0–0 draw in his 325th national league match, going on to set a record of 105 clean sheets which in 2003 was beaten by Jason Petkovic.

He represented Australia at schoolboy international level in 1981, but never played a full international for his adopted country, though he was chosen for two representative matches against visiting European club sides, Torpedo Moscow in 1990 and Vitesse Arnhem in 1993.

References

1965 births
Living people
Footballers from Wembley
Australian soccer players
Association football goalkeepers
APIA Leichhardt FC players
Marconi Stallions FC players
Notts County F.C. players
Birmingham City F.C. players
Sydney Olympic FC players
National Soccer League (Australia) players
English Football League players
Newcastle Breakers FC players